The Republican Antifascist Military Union (UMRA) was a self-described anti-fascist organization for members of the Spanish Republican Armed Forces in Spain during the period of the Second Spanish Republic.

By 1935, the Spanish Military Union, a secret military organization of pro-fascist officers of the Spanish Republican Armed Forces had extended its influence among Spanish officers and began displaying open hostility towards the Spanish Republic. In order to oppose and neutralize this movement, Eugenio Rodríguez Sierra, an officer of the Spanish Republican Navy was instrumental in the foundation of the Antifascist Military  Union. The Unión Militar Antifascista was later merged with the Republican Military Union, another group of similar goals that had been founded in 1929 within the Army, in order to create the Republican Antifascist Military Union.

One of the members of UMRA, Captain Carlos Faraudo, would be blacklisted by Spanish Military Union. He had allegedly been placed at the top of the list before being murdered. Membership of this secret society was especially high among the Assault Guard. One of its leading members, Captain Díaz Tendero, was later to perish at the Mauthausen–Gusen concentration camp.

Footnotes

Bibliography 
 
 
 
 

Anti-fascist organisations in Spain
Organisations of the Spanish Civil War